The Pantheon of Illustrious Men is a royal site in Madrid, under the administration of the Patrimonio Nacional. It was designed by Spanish architect Fernando Arbós y Tremanti, and is located in Basilica of Nuestra Señora de Atocha in the Retiro section of Madrid.

Notable interments
The pantheon houses the tombs of a number of famous Spaniards including:
 Leandro Fernández de Moratín (1760-1828), dramatist
 Francisco de Paula Martinez de la Rosa (1789-1862), prime minister
 Juan Álvarez Mendizábal (1790-1853), politician
 Antonio de los Ríos y Rosas (1812-1873), politician, whose tomb is designed by Pedro Estany
 Práxedes Mateo Sagasta (1825-1903), prime minister, whose tomb is the work of sculptor Mariano Benlliure
 Antonio Cánovas del Castillo (1828-1897), prime minister, by Catalan sculptor Agustí Querol Subirats
 Eduardo Dato e Iradier (1856-1921), prime minister, by sculptor Mariano Benlliure
 José Canalejas (1854-1912), prime minister, by sculptor Mariano Benlliure

Notable structures
The site also contains its own version of the statue of Liberty, an 1857 tomb designed by sculptors Federico Aparici, Ponciano Ponzano and Sabino Medina, moved here in 1912.

Gallery

References

External links 

 Patrimonio Nacional | Pantheon of Illustrious Men

Buildings and structures in Pacífico neighborhood, Madrid
Bien de Interés Cultural landmarks in Madrid
Byzantine Revival architecture in Spain